This is a list of O'PEN Skiff sailboat championships.

Open World championship

Open Under 19 World championship

Open Under 16 World championship

Open Under 15 World championship

Open Under 13 World championship

Open Under 12 World championship

References

O'PEN Skiff
World championships in sailing